Turagua is a tiny town located in Aragua State, Venezuela.

See also
 Autódromo Internacional de Turagua Pancho Pepe Cróquer

Sources
Pueblos de Venezuela: Turagua, Estado Aragua (Spanish)
Wikimapia: Turagua, Venezuela

Populated places in Aragua